Malacky (German: Malatzka, Hungarian: Malacka) is a town and municipality in western Slovakia around  north from capital Bratislava. From the second half of the 10th century until 1918, it was part of the Kingdom of Hungary.

It is one of the centres of the region "Záhorie", between the Little Carpathians in the east and Morava River in the west and a cultural and economic hub for nearby villages such as Gajary, Kostolište, Veľké Leváre and Jakubov. The town is located on the large Prague-Brno-Bratislava highway, and many residents commute daily to Bratislava. The Little Carpathians mountain range with its network of signposted trails provides excellent opportunities for mountain biking.

Etymology
The origin of the name is uncertain. According to the first theory, the name refers to the Hungarian word malacka which means "piglet" in Hungarian and because the town seal features a pig. A drawback of this theory is that the Hungarian malacka is only a later borrowing from Slovenian and the name is older than the borrowing (Slovene mladec – a young man, in wide meaning also a young animal; Slovak equivalent is mládenec). Other theories derive the name from Slovak mláky (fens, swamps), mlátiť (to flail, to smash, thus a placename derived from mlátiť was Mlaky > Malacky) or from the name of the Malina creek (recorded as Maliscapotoca).

History
The name of the city was first mentioned in writing in 1206. During World War II, Malacky was captured on 5 April 1945 by troops of the Soviet 2nd Ukrainian Front.

Famous Buildings and Sites
The most prominent sites in Malacky include the Franciscan church of the Immaculate Conception of Mary, the so-called "Palffy Palace" and the renovated synagogue. The church includes a precise from 1653 of the so-called Holy Stairs (Scala Sancta) that Christ ascended to the Pretorium of Pilate. The Palffy Palace until recently was used as a hospital and is currently unoccupied. It has recently been acquired by the local municipality. Located in the center of Malacky is also a large renovated synagogue built in 1886 in Moorish Revival style which is now being used a cultural center. Adjacent to it there is sport arena "MALINA" containing two indoor swimming pools (25m and 12m) and a multifunctional hall used for handball, basketball, volleyball and indoor football.

Economy
Swedspan, a subsidiary of IKEA, operates a large lumber plant just south of the city.

In September 2008, Slovak National Party (SNS) President Ján Slota facilitated the erection of a large Slovak cross near Malacky as a demonstration of Slovak nationalism.

Demographics
According to the 2001 census, the town had 18,063 inhabitants. 96.68% of inhabitants were Slovaks, 1.02% Czechs and 0.51% Hungarians. The religious makeup was 70.35% Roman Catholics, 19.48% people with no religious affiliation, and 1.98% Lutherans.
According to the 1910 census 75% were slovaks.

People
István Friedrich, prime minister of Hungary for three months in 1919, was born here.
Ernst Wiesner, modern architect who designed buildings in Brno, was born here.
Martin Benka, a Slovak painter and illustrator, was born near here and died here in 1971.
Ádám Liszt, the father of composer and pianist Franz Liszt, was born here in 1776.
Ivan Dérer, a Slovak politician, lawyer and journalist, was born here in 1884.
Ludwig Angerer, an Austrian photographer, was born here in 1827.
Karol Machata, a Slovak actor, was born here in 1928.
Štefan Lux, a Slovak Jewish journalist, was born here in 1888.
Samuel Mráz, (born 1997) footballer
František Lukovský, small business owner, who committed a suicide in 2002 in front of the tax office using self-made guillotine.

Twin towns — sister cities

Malacky is twinned with:

 Veselí nad Moravou, Czech Republic
 Żnin, Poland (since 2001) 
 Albertirsa, Hungary (since 2000) 
 Szarvas, Hungary
 Gänserndorf, Austria

References

External links

 Municipal website
 Map of Malacky

 
Cities and towns in Slovakia
Villages and municipalities in Malacky District